Big Big Love may refer to:

"Big Love" (Fleetwood Mac song), 1987
BigBigLove, a 2004 album by Little Birdy
"Big, Big Love", a 1961 song by Wynn Stewart, covered by k.d. lang and the Reclines in 1989
"Big Big Love (Fig. 2)", a song by Foals from the 2008 album Antidotes